Scaphinotus petersi is a species of ground beetle in the family Carabidae. It is found in North America.

Subspecies
 Scaphinotus petersi biedermani Roeschke, 1907
 Scaphinotus petersi catalinae Van Dyke, 1924
 Scaphinotus petersi corvus (Fall, 1910)
 Scaphinotus petersi grahami Van Dyke, 1938
 Scaphinotus petersi kathleenae Ball, 1966
 Scaphinotus petersi petersi Roeschke, 1907

References

Further reading

 
 
 
 
 
 

Carabinae
Beetles described in 1907